Richard Wunderlich (born 30 September 1984) is a Liechtensteiner bobsledder. He competed for Liechtenstein at the 2010 Winter Olympics in the four-man event. Wunder was Liechtenstein's flag bearer during the 2010 Winter Olympics opening ceremony.

References 

1984 births
Living people
Liechtenstein male bobsledders
Olympic bobsledders of Liechtenstein
Bobsledders at the 2010 Winter Olympics
Place of birth missing (living people)